Arthur Ernest Berry (18 September 1928 – 19 December 2016) was a New Zealand  cricketer. He played four first-class matches for Otago between 1955 and 1956.

Berry died in Timaru on 19 December 2016.

References

1928 births
2016 deaths
New Zealand cricketers
Otago cricketers
Cricketers from Dunedin